Yamacraw may refer to:

Yamacraw, a Native American tribe
Yamacraw, Kentucky, an unincorporated community and coal town in McCreary County
Yamacraw, North Carolina, an unincorporated community in Pender County
Yamacraw Bluff, in the U.S. state of Georgia
USCGC Yamacraw, two ships of the United States Coast Guard
Yamacraw running race in Daniel Boone National Forest
Yamekraw, a 1927 jazz composition